Gompholobium preissii is a species of flowering plant in the family Fabaceae and is endemic to the south-west of Western Australia. It is an erect shrub with pinnate leaves with five to fifteen leaflets, and yellow, red and orange, pea-like flowers.

Description

Taxonomy
Gompholobium preissii was first formally described in 1844 by Carl Meissner in Lehmann's Plantae Preissianae. The specific epithet (preissii) honours Ludwig Preiss.

Distribution and habitat
This species of gompholobium on lateritic soils and is widespread in the south-western of Western Australia.

Conservation status
Gompholobium preissii is classified as "not threatened" by the Western Australian Government Department of Parks and Wildlife.

References

preissii
Eudicots of Western Australia
Plants described in 1844
Taxa named by Carl Meissner